is a former Japanese football player.

Playing career
Hayama was born in Kanagawa Prefecture on May 20, 1978. After graduating from University of Tsukuba, he joined J1 League club Tokyo Verdy in 2001. Although he played several matches as side back and defensive midfielder every season from first season, he could not play many matches. In August 2003, he moved to J1 club Vegalta Sendai. However he could not play at all in the match and the club was relegated to J2 League end of 2003 season. In 2004, he moved to Japan Football League club Gunma FC Horikoshi (later FC Horikoshi). He played many matches as regular player in 2 seasons. In 2006, he moved to his first club Tokyo Verdy in J2. However he could not play at all in the match and retired end of 2006 season.

Club statistics

References

External links

1978 births
Living people
University of Tsukuba alumni
Association football people from Kanagawa Prefecture
Japanese footballers
J1 League players
J2 League players
Japan Football League players
Tokyo Verdy players
Vegalta Sendai players
Arte Takasaki players
Association football defenders